Masih, also spelled Mesih or Maseeh, is a name of Arabic origin which means 'Messiah' or 'Christ'. The word  is the Arabic form of the Hebrew title  or the Greek title , meaning "anointed one". It is used as a name and title for Jesus in the Quran, and is also the common word used by Arab Christians for Christ.

Masih is also a common Christian surname in India and Pakistan. Some people in India and Pakistan have adopted the surname Masih after their conversion to Christianity.

In Mughal India (1526–1857), Christians such as the Bourbons of India were honoured with the title Masih.

Historical 

Dionysius bar Masih (died 1204), leader of the Syriac Orthodox Church
Mesih Pasha (died 1501), Ottoman Grand Admiral and later Grand Vizier
Mesihi of Prishtina ( 1470–1512), Ottoman poet
Hadim Mesih Pasha (died 1589), Ottoman Grand Vizier

Modern

Given name 
 Bir Masih Saunta (born 1969), Indian politician 
 Masih Alinejad (born 1976), Iranian journalist and writer
 Masih Masihnia, Iranian footballer
 Masih Saighani, Afghan footballer
 Masih Ullah Barakzai, Afghan footballer
 Masih Zahedi, Iranian footballer
 Muhammad Masihullah Khan (1911/1912–1992), Indian Deobandi Islamic scholar

Surname 

Akram Masih Gill, Pakistani politician
Arif Masih, (born 1970) Pakistani politician
Fariborz Maseeh, Iranian-American engineer
Ijaz Masih, Pakistani politician
Iqbal Masih (1983–1995), Pakistani boy who became a symbol of abusive child labour in the developing world
Michael Masih (born 1985), Pakistani football player
Naeem Masih (born 1987), Pakistani para-athlete 
Rakesh Masih (born 1987), Indian football player 
Shazia Masih (1997–2010), Pakistani torture victim

See also 

Christianity in India
Christianity in Pakistan
Christianity in the Middle East
Jai Masih Ki, Hindi-Urdu greeting phrase meaning 'Victory to Christ'
List of Arabic given names
Masih (title)

References 

Arabic given names
Surnames of Indian origin
Surnames of Pakistani origin